The Spirit of St. Louis is a 1957 aviation biography film in CinemaScope and Warnercolor from Warner Bros., directed by Billy Wilder, produced by Leland Hayward, and starring James Stewart as Charles Lindbergh. The screenplay was adapted by Charles Lederer, Wendell Mayes, and Billy Wilder from Lindbergh's 1953 autobiographical account of his historic flight, which won the Pulitzer Prize in 1954.

Along with reminiscences of his early days in aviation, the film's storyline largely focuses on Lindbergh's lengthy preparation for, and accomplishment of, his history-making transatlantic flight in the purpose-built Spirit of St. Louis high-wing monoplane. His takeoff begins at Roosevelt Field and ends 33 hours later on May 21, 1927 when he lands safely at Le Bourget Field in Paris. The film ends with actual newsreel footage of Lindbergh's ticker tape parade in New York.

Plot
On May 19, 1927, after waiting a week for the rain to stop on Long Island, New York, pilot Charles A. "Slim" Lindbergh tries to sleep in a hotel near Roosevelt Field before his transatlantic flight from New York to Paris. His friend Frank Mahoney guards his hotel-room door from reporters. Unable to sleep, Lindbergh reminisces about his time as an airmail pilot.

In a flashback sequence, Lindbergh lands his old de Havilland biplane at a small airfield to refuel on the way to Chicago. Despite bad weather, he takes off, unaware that heavy snow has closed the Chicago landing field. Lindbergh is forced to bail out in a storm after running out of fuel. Recovering mail from his crashed DH-4, he continues to Chicago by train. A suspender salesman tells him that two airmen just died competing for the Orteig Prize for the first nonstop flight from New York City to Paris. 

Lindbergh calls Columbia Aircraft Corporation in New York from a small diner at the Lambert-St. Louis Flying Field. Quoted a price of $15,000 ($ today) for a Bellanca high-wing monoplane, Lindbergh lobbies St. Louis financiers with a plan to fly the Atlantic in 40 hours in a stripped-down, single-engine aircraft. The backers are excited by Lindbergh's vision and dub the venture Spirit of St. Louis.

When the Bellanca deal falls apart because Columbia insists on selecting the pilot, Lindbergh approaches Ryan Airlines, a small manufacturer in San Diego, California. Frank Mahoney, the company's owner and president, promises to build a suitable monoplane in just 90 days. With Ryan's chief engineer Donald Hall, a design takes shape. To decrease weight, Lindbergh refuses to install a radio or other heavy equipment, even a parachute, and plans to navigate by "dead reckoning". With no autopilot function available, Lindbergh will not be able to sleep during the flight. With the deadline pressing, Ryan workers agree to work around the clock, completing the monoplane in just 62 days.

Lindbergh flies The Spirit of St. Louis to New York, stopping at Lambert Field (St. Louis Lambert International Airport) on the way to show the aircraft to his investors. He prepares for the flight at Roosevelt Field, ensuring that 450 gallons of fuel is on board for the long flight. In the cramped cockpit, which does not allow direct forward view, the magnetic compass must fit above his head; a young woman offers her compact mirror, which is attached with chewing gum so that Lindbergh can read the compass. Mahoney secretly slips a Saint Christopher medal into a bag of sandwiches on board.

As the weather clears, The Spirit of St. Louis trundles down the muddy runway and barely clears electric lines and treetops. An American newspaper's headline reads: "Lindy Is Off!" Every hour, Lindbergh switches fuel tanks to keep the airplane's weight balanced. As he flies over Cape Cod, Lindbergh realizes that he has not slept in 28 hours. He recalls past times when he had slept on railroad tracks, short bunk beds, and under a windmill. When he begins to doze, he is awakened by a fly. Over Nova Scotia, he sees a motorcyclist below, remembering his own Harley-Davidson motorcycle that he had once traded as partial payment for his first aircraft, a World War I war-surplus Curtiss Jenny.

Over the seemingly endless Atlantic, Lindbergh remembers barnstorming across the Midwest in a flying circus. After 18 hours, ice forms on the wings and engine, and the aircraft begins losing altitude. Lindbergh changes course and the ice breaks off in the warmer air; the engine, which had stopped, is restarted. Back on course, his compasses begin malfunctioning, forcing him to navigate by the stars. By dawn, he falls asleep, and the monoplane slowly descends in a wide spiral toward the ocean. Sunlight reflecting off the compact's mirror finally awakens him in time to regain flight control.

Seeing a seagull, Lindbergh realizes that he is close to land. He tries without success to hail a fisherman below. Sighting land, he determines that he has reached Dingle Bay, Ireland. Pulling out a sandwich from a paper bag, Lindbergh discovers the hidden Saint Christopher medal and hangs it on the instrument panel. Crossing the English Channel and the coast of France, Lindbergh follows the Seine up to Paris as darkness falls.

Finally seeing the city lights ahead of him, Lindbergh approaches Le Bourget Airfield in the dark, becoming disoriented by panning spotlights aimed into the sky. He glimpses strange movements and lights below, in reality huge crowds of people and traffic in and around Le Bourget. Confused by this chaos, Lindbergh begins his landing approach, quickly becoming panicked. As he goes lower, he whispers "Oh, God, help me!"

Landing safely and bringing The Spirit of St. Louis to a full stop, Lindbergh is rushed by hordes of people while sitting in the plane. As flash powder ignites and photos are taken, Lindbergh is carried triumphantly on people's shoulders toward a hangar. An exhausted Lindbergh eventually realizes that the crowds, numbering 200,000, are cheering for him and his achievement. On returning to New York City, Lindbergh, having now become a national hero, is given a huge ticker tape parade, with four million people lining the parade route.

Cast
 James Stewart as Charles Lindbergh
 Murray Hamilton as Harlan A. "Bud" Gurney
 Patricia Smith as Mirror Girl
 Bartlett Robinson as Benjamin Frank Mahoney
 Arthur Space as Donald A. Hall
 Marc Connelly as Father Hussman
 Charles Watts as O.W. Schultz
 Aaron Spelling as Mr. Fearless (uncredited)
 Richard Deacon as Charles A. Levine (uncredited)

Production

When production began in August 1955, Jack Warner offered the role of Lindbergh to John Kerr, who turned it down. Numerous sources indicate that Stewart was lobbying Warner Bros. executives for the role as early as 1954. Stewart did not take a salary for the role in return for a share of the gross. At age 47 when the film was shot, Stewart underwent a strenuous diet and regimen to more closely resemble the 25-year-old Lindbergh of 1927. Stewart (with hair dyed blond) was ultimately cast as Lindbergh, but his age was pointedly an issue in post-production reviews.

Stewart had a lifelong passion for aviation and Lindbergh's story. Later in his life, he recalled Lindbergh's famous flight as among the most significant events of his youth, one that led him to seek a career as an aviator. Like Lindbergh, Stewart had been an USAAF pilot, and both eventually retired from the U.S. Air Force Reserve at the grade of brigadier general.

To accurately depict the transatlantic flight, three replicas, at a cost of $1.3 million (equal to $ million today), were made of the Spirit of St. Louis for the various filming units stateside, in Europe and in the studio. Stewart purchased a similar Ryan Brougham that was modified under Lindbergh's supervision. In 1959, Stewart donated the aircraft to the Henry Ford Museum in Dearborn, Michigan. The second replica was donated to the San Diego Aerospace Museum but was destroyed in 1978 when a fire gutted the Electric Building in Balboa Park that housed the museum. The third replica is displayed in the Missouri History Museum in St. Louis.

Filming took place at the Santa Maria Public Airport in Santa Maria, California, at what is currently the site of Allan Hancock College. A non-flying replica for ground shots was also built, which currently hangs in the Minneapolis−Saint Paul International Airport.
Aerial sequences were directed by Paul Mantz and were taken from a North American B-25 bomber converted as a camera platform for photography.

During pre-production in August 1955, a small film crew was sent to New York to shoot footage at Roosevelt Field on Long Island and later to film aerial sequences over the Appalachian Mountains in Nova Scotia and at St. John's, Newfoundland, recreating the initial stages of the transatlantic flight. Principal photography began on September 2, 1955, with filming taking place at  L'aérodrome de Guyancourt, near Versailles, which would stand in for Le Bourget. Difficulties with Stewart's schedule led to the abandonment of aerial sequences that had been planned with Stewart actually flying one of the replicas over European locales. Ultimately, staged scenes using a mock-up on a sound stage had to suffice. The film's schedule was disrupted throughout the fall and only resumed in November when Stewart had completed two other films. The original 64-day schedule ballooned into a 115-day marathon, as weather and Stewart's unavailability hampered the production, with final sequences shot in March 1956. The film eventually cost $7,000,000.

Aaron Spelling appears as Mr. Fearless in an uncredited role that marks an early foray into acting.

Reception
The film garnered mixed reviews, with Bosley Crowther at The New York Times praising the "... exciting and suspenseful episodes" while noting that Stewart's performance as Lindbergh did not convey the human side well:However, the film was commended for its special effects and Stewart's performance. Time in its 1957  review describes the actor's success in conveying on screen the public's perception of Lindbergh's feat three decades earlier:

The film opened at Radio City Music Hall in New York City on February 21, 1957 and helped set a Broadway record gross of $829,500 for Washington's Birthday week with its gross of $160,000 (also a record for Washington's Birthday).

Overall, early results had not been promising, and when put into general release on April 20, 1957, The Spirit of St. Louis was a box-office failure.

In recent years, the film has regained some of its luster, and a modern reevaluation has centered on the screenplay's characterization of Lindbergh and the methodical depiction of the preparations for the momentous flight. The Smithsonian Institution periodically screens the film as part of its "classic" series, and the DVD re-release in 2006, with remixed and digitized elements and a small number of special features, has evoked commentary such as "captivating" and "suspenseful".

Awards and honors
At the 1958 Academy Awards, Louis Lichtenfield earned a nomination for Best Special Effects.

The film was ranked #69 on the American Film Institute list AFI's 100 Years...100 Cheers.

References

Notes

Citations

Bibliography

 Andersen, Elmer L. A Man's Reach. Minneapolis, Minnesota: University Of Minnesota Press, 2004. .
 Bryan, Ford Richardson. Henry's Attic: Some Fascinating Gifts to Henry Ford and his Museum. Detroit: Wayne State University Press, 1996. .
 Eliot, Mark. Jimmy Stewart: A Biography. New York: Random House, 2006. .
 Hardwick, Jack and Ed Schnepf. "A Viewer's Guide to Aviation Movies." The Making of the Great Aviation Films, General Aviation Series, Volume 2, 1989.
 Jones, Ken D., Arthur F. McClure and Alfred E. Twomey. The Films of James Stewart. New York: Castle Books, 1970.
 Kaercher, Dan, ed. Best of the Midwest: Rediscovering America's Heartland (Insiders ' Guide). Guilford, Connecticut: Globe Pequot, First edition, 2005. .
 McGowan, Helene. James Stewart. London: Bison Group, 1992, .
 Phillips, Gene D. Some Like It Wilder: The Life and Controversial Films of Billy Wilder (Screen Classics). Lexington, Kentucky: The University Press of Kentucky, 2009. .
 Pickard, Roy. Jimmy Stewart: A Life in Film. New York: St. Martin's Press, 1992. .
 Smith, Starr. Jimmy Stewart: Bomber Pilot. St. Paul, Minnesota: Zenith Press, 2005. .

See also
 List of American films of 1957

External links

 
 
 
 
 The Spirit of St. Louis article at Turner Classic Movies.
 

1957 films
1950s biographical drama films
American biographical drama films
American aviation films
1950s English-language films
Films scored by Franz Waxman
Films based on biographies
Films directed by Billy Wilder
Films set in the 1920s
Films set in St. Louis
Films set in Texas
Films set in Ireland
Films set in Paris
Films set in New York (state)
Films set on airplanes
Warner Bros. films
CinemaScope films
Films with screenplays by Charles Lederer
Films with screenplays by Billy Wilder
Cultural depictions of Charles Lindbergh
Films with screenplays by Wendell Mayes
1957 drama films
Biographical films about aviators
1950s American films